Minuscule 107 (in the Gregory-Aland numbering), ε 344 (Soden), is a Greek minuscule manuscript of the New Testament, on parchment leaves. Palaeographically it has been assigned to the 13th century.

Description 

The codex contains a complete text of the four Gospels on 351 parchment leaves. The text is written in one column per page, 18-22 lines per page. The initial letters in gold.

It was written by more than one scribe. The first page of Matthew is written in gold.

The Greek text of the codex is a representative of the Byzantine text-type. Hermann von Soden classified it to the textual family Kx. Aland placed it in Category V.
According to the Claremont Profile Method it represents mixed Byzantine text in Luke 1, textual family Kx in Luke 20, in Luke 10 no profile was made.

History 

It was examined by Wettstein, Griesbach, and Scholz. Wettsteins's and Griesbach's 107 is Gregory's minuscule 201. Scholz dated the manuscript to the 14th century.

C. R. Gregory saw it in 1883.

It is housed at the Bodleian Library (E. D. Clarke 6) at Oxford.

See also 
 List of New Testament minuscules
 Biblical manuscript
 Textual criticism

References

Further reading 

 

Greek New Testament minuscules
13th-century biblical manuscripts
Bodleian Library collection